2010 Peshawar bombing may refer to:

5 April 2010 North-West Frontier Province attacks
19 April 2010 Peshawar bombing